During the 2002–03 English football season, Charlton Athletic competed in the FA Premier League.

Season summary
Another solid season resulted in a mid-table finish for Charlton. However, the end of the season proved to be the undoing of Alan Curbishley's men once more, and after the start of March, they only managed one more victory, dropping to 12th place in the final table. Considering the relatively small budget Curbishley was operating on; even this was quite an achievement.

Midfielder Scott Parker was nominated for the PFA Young Player of the Year award, but lost to Jermaine Jenas of Newcastle United.

This season saw the final competitive appearance of  Richard Rufus coming against Liverpool on 21 April 2003. Rufus had  spent his entire career with the one club. While playing for Charlton he was capped six times by England U21. Over 11 years the centre back had made 288 appearances , scoring 12 goals.

Final league table

Results per matchday

Premier League

FA Cup

League Cup

Players

First-team squad
Squad at end of season

Left club during season

Reserve squad

Statistics

Appearances and goals

|-
! colspan=14 style=background:#dcdcdc; text-align:center| Goalkeepers

|-
! colspan=14 style=background:#dcdcdc; text-align:center| Defenders

|-
! colspan=14 style=background:#dcdcdc; text-align:center| Midfielders

|-
! colspan=14 style=background:#dcdcdc; text-align:center| Forwards

|-
! colspan=14 style=background:#dcdcdc; text-align:center| Players transferred out during the season

References

Notes

Charlton Athletic F.C. seasons
Charlton Athletic